Little Silver is a borough in Monmouth County, in the U.S. state of New Jersey. As of the 2020 United States census, the borough's population was 6,131, an increase of 181 (+3.0%) from the 2010 census count of 5,950, which in turn reflected a drop of 220 (−3.6%) from the 6,170 counted in the 2000 census.

Little Silver was established with a King's land grant in 1663 and settled in 1667. Little Silver was incorporated as a borough by an act of the New Jersey Legislature on March 19, 1923, from portions of Shrewsbury Township, based on the results of a referendum held on April 28, 1923.

History
Prior to the settlement of Europeans, the area that is now Little Silver was inhabited by the Navesink Native Americans.

There are several tales of how Little Silver received its name. In one, brothers Joseph and Peter Parker, who settled in this area in 1667 and owned land bounded by Parker's Creek on the south and Little Silver Creek on the north, named their holdings "Little Silver" after their father's (George Parker) estate in Portsmouth, Rhode Island. The original Parker Homestead, dating to 1725 and one of the state's oldest, was acquired by the borough and is undergoing renovation.

Other explanations for the derivation of the name are the payment to Native Americans for purchase of the land and the placid appearance of the water.

The borough's earliest European residents were primarily farmers, fishermen and merchants.

Early families and businesses include:
 Parkers – Joseph and Peter Parker originally settled the area, and their original homestead at 235 Rumson Road has been declared a state historic site.
 Sickles – Harold and Elsie Sickles acquired land and opened a wholesale truck farm in 1908. The land was acquired from Harold's mother who was related to the Parkers. Transitioning from seasonal to year-round in 1998, Sickles Market is today a successful specialty garden and food market.
 Little Silver Bottle Shop – Established in 1944, the iconic wine & spirits shop is the oldest continually running retail business in the borough.

John T. Lovett owned a nursery that once covered almost half the borough, supplying large catalog houses such as Sears Roebuck, Macy's and Newberry's. In 1878 he circulated a petition to the community recommending that the name be revised and on July 30, 1879, the Post Office name was changed from "Parkersville" to "Little Silver".

The borough has had a varied history as a resort, agricultural area and fishing town. Today, the municipality is primarily residential with a range of housing types, from ranches and capes.

Little Silver separated from Shrewsbury Township in 1923. Since then, farms and nurseries have been replaced by housing. Over the years, New York City and North Jersey commuters have made Little Silver their home, traveling by rail or auto to their jobs. The Little Silver train station on Sycamore Avenue was designed by the noted American architect Henry Hobson Richardson and built in 1890. It reopened after renovations in 2003.

Geography
According to the United States Census Bureau, the borough had a total area of 3.32 square miles (8.60 km2), including 2.71 square miles (7.02 km2) of land and 0.61 square miles (1.57 km2) of water (18.28%).

The original farms and nurseries have almost all been replaced by housing today. Little Silver's location on the Shrewsbury River makes it a popular destination for boaters and water sports enthusiasts, with a public boat ramp at the Dominick F. Santelle Park off Riverview Avenue. Approximately 8% of the homes are directly on the Shrewsbury River and another third of homes are on streams that connect to it.

The borough borders the Monmouth County municipalities of Fair Haven, Monmouth Beach, Oceanport, Red Bank, Rumson and Shrewsbury Borough.

Little Silver Point is an unincorporated community located within Little Silver.

Demographics

2010 census

The Census Bureau's 2006–2010 American Community Survey showed that (in 2010 inflation-adjusted dollars) median household income was $144,299 (with a margin of error of +/− $23,666) and the median family income was $167,659 (+/− $28,090). Males had a median income of $126,556 (+/− $27,434) versus $71,667 (+/− $13,832) for females. The per capita income for the borough was $66,069 (+/− $8,285). About 1.7% of families and 2.1% of the population were below the poverty line, including 0.7% of those under age 18 and 1.7% of those age 65 or over.

2000 census
As of the 2000 United States census, there were 6,170 people, 2,232 households, and 1,810 families residing in the borough. The population density was 2,226.2 people per square mile (860.0/km2). There were 2,288 housing units at an average density of 825.5 per square mile (318.9/km2). The racial makeup of the borough was 97.15% White, 0.31% African American, 0.16% Native American, 1.51% Asian, 0.02% Pacific Islander, 0.19% from other races, and 0.66% from two or more races. Hispanic or Latino of any race were 1.31% of the population.

There were 2,232 households, out of which 37.9% had children under the age of 18 living with them, 72.5% were married couples living together, 7.0% had a female householder with no husband present, and 18.9% were non-families. 16.8% of all households were made up of individuals, and 8.4% had someone living alone who was 65 years of age or older. The average household size was 2.76 and the average family size was 3.13.

In the borough the population was spread out, with 27.4% under the age of 18, 4.2% from 18 to 24, 25.0% from 25 to 44, 27.7% from 45 to 64, and 15.7% who were 65 years of age or older. The median age was 41 years. For every 100 females, there were 93.4 males. For every 100 females age 18 and over, there were 87.0 males.

The median income for a household in the borough was $94,094, and the median income for a family was $104,033. Males had a median income of $90,941 versus $45,938 for females. The per capita income for the borough was $46,798. About 0.4% of families and 0.8% of the population were below the poverty line, including none of those under age 18 and 0.8% of those age 65 or over.

Government

Local government
Little Silver is governed under the Borough form of New Jersey municipal government, which is used in 218 municipalities (of the 564) statewide, making it the most common form of government in New Jersey. The governing body is comprised of the Mayor and the Borough Council, with all positions elected at-large on a partisan basis as part of the November general election. A Mayor is elected directly by the voters to a four-year term of office. The Borough Council is comprised of six members elected to serve three-year terms on a staggered basis, with two seats coming up for election each year in a three-year cycle. The Borough form of government used by Little Silver is a "weak mayor / strong council" government in which council members act as the legislative body with the mayor presiding at meetings and voting only in the event of a tie. The mayor can veto ordinances subject to an override by a two-thirds majority vote of the council. The mayor makes committee and liaison assignments for council members, and most appointments are made by the mayor with the advice and consent of the council.

, the Mayor of Little Silver is Republican Robert C. Neff Jr., whose term of office ends December 31, 2023. Members of the Borough Council are Council President Stephanie Brannagan (R, 2024), Kevin Brennan (R, 2023), Donald S. Galante (R, 2022), Michael E. Holzapfel (R, 2023), Christian M. Smith (R, 2024) and Corinne Thygeson (R, 2022).

In March 2016, the Borough Council selected Corinne Thygeson from three candidates nominated by the Republican municipal committee to fill the seat expiring in December 2016 that had been held by Stuart W. Van Winkle that became vacant upon his resignation; Thygeson will serve on an interim basis until the November 2016 general election, when voters will select a candidate to fill the balance of the term.

In January 2015, the Borough Council selected Glenn Talavera to fill the vacant seat expiring December 2015 of Richard J. "Rick" Scott, who resigned from office as work obligations will have him out of the borough.

In September 2011, following the death of mayor Suzanne Castleman in July 2011, Robert Neff was appointed to fill the vacant mayoral seat, while Donald Galante, a former member of the Borough Council, was appointed to fill Neff's vacant council seat.

Little Silver is a participating municipality in an initiative to study regionalizing their municipal police force with one or more municipalities. The borough received a grant from the New Jersey Department of Community Affairs in the amount of $40,950 along with the Boroughs of Fair Haven, Oceanport, Shrewsbury and Rumson to hire professional consultants to conduct the study on their behalf.  A report delivered in July 2008 recommended that Fair Haven, Little Silver and Rumson should consider a network of shared police services, with consideration of inclusion of Oceanport and Shrewsbury deferred to a second phase.

Federal, state, and county representation
Little Silver is located in the 6th Congressional District and is part of New Jersey's 13th state legislative district. 

Prior to the 2011 reapportionment following the 2010 Census, Little Silver had been in the 12th state legislative district.

 

Monmouth County is governed by a Board of County Commissioners comprised of five members who are elected at-large to serve three year terms of office on a staggered basis, with either one or two seats up for election each year as part of the November general election. At an annual reorganization meeting held in the beginning of January, the board selects one of its members to serve as Director and another as Deputy Director. , Monmouth County's Commissioners are
Commissioner Director Thomas A. Arnone (R, Neptune City, term as commissioner and as director ends December 31, 2022), 
Commissioner Deputy Director Susan M. Kiley (R, Hazlet Township, term as commissioner ends December 31, 2024; term as deputy commissioner director ends 2022),
Lillian G. Burry (R, Colts Neck Township, 2023),
Nick DiRocco (R, Wall Township, 2022), and 
Ross F. Licitra (R, Marlboro Township, 2023). 
Constitutional officers elected on a countywide basis are
County clerk Christine Giordano Hanlon (R, 2025; Ocean Township), 
Sheriff Shaun Golden (R, 2022; Howell Township) and 
Surrogate Rosemarie D. Peters (R, 2026; Middletown Township).

Politics
As of March 2011, there were a total of 4,677 registered voters in Little Silver, of which 1,065 (22.8%) were registered as Democrats, 1,486 (31.8%) were registered as Republicans and 2,124 (45.4%) were registered as Unaffiliated. There were 2 voters registered as either Libertarians or Greens.

In the 2012 presidential election, Republican Mitt Romney received 61.4% of the vote (2,186 cast), ahead of Democrat Barack Obama with 37.8% (1,344 votes), and other candidates with 0.8% (29 votes), among the 3,574 ballots cast by the borough's 4,903 registered voters (15 ballots were spoiled), for a turnout of 72.9%. In the 2008 presidential election, Republican John McCain received 55.7% of the vote (2,155 cast), ahead of Democrat Barack Obama with 42.0% (1,625 votes) and other candidates with 1.1% (41 votes), among the 3,867 ballots cast by the borough's 4,879 registered voters, for a turnout of 79.3%. In the 2004 presidential election, Republican George W. Bush received 60.1% of the vote (2,310 ballots cast), outpolling Democrat John Kerry with 39.1% (1,501 votes) and other candidates with 0.4% (19 votes), among the 3,842 ballots cast by the borough's 4,752 registered voters, for a turnout percentage of 80.9.

In the 2013 gubernatorial election, Republican Chris Christie received 74.3% of the vote (1,639 cast), ahead of Democrat Barbara Buono with 24.0% (530 votes), and other candidates with 1.6% (36 votes), among the 2,230 ballots cast by the borough's 4,837 registered voters (25 ballots were spoiled), for a turnout of 46.1%. In the 2009 gubernatorial election, Republican Chris Christie received 67.5% of the vote (1,865 ballots cast), ahead of Democrat Jon Corzine with 25.9% (715 votes), Independent Chris Daggett with 5.9% (163 votes) and other candidates with 0.4% (12 votes), among the 2,761 ballots cast by the borough's 4,752 registered voters, yielding a 58.1% turnout.

Education
The Little Silver School District serves students in pre-kindergarten through eighth grade. As of the 2021–22 school year, the district, comprised of two schools, had an enrollment of 776 students and 77.8 classroom teachers (on an FTE basis), for a student–teacher ratio of 10.0:1. Schools in the district (with 2021–22 enrollment data from the National Center for Education Statistics) are 
Point Road School with 393 students in grades PreK-4 and 
Markham Place School with 380 students in grades 5-8.

For ninth through twelfth grades, students attend Red Bank Regional High School, which serves students from the boroughs of Little Silver, Red Bank and Shrewsbury, along with students in the district's academy programs from other communities who are eligible to attend on a tuition basis. Students from other Monmouth County municipalities are eligible to attend the high school for its performing arts program, with admission on a competitive basis. The borough has two elected representatives on the nine-member Board of Education. As of the 2021–22 school year, the high school had an enrollment of 1,247 students and 117.8 classroom teachers (on an FTE basis), for a student–teacher ratio of 10.6:1.

Transportation

Roads and highways

County Route 520 passes through the heart of the borough. The closest limited access road is the Garden State Parkway via CR 520 in Middletown Township.

Public transportation

The Little Silver station is served by trains on NJ Transit's North Jersey Coast Line. The station is one of the few on the electrified portion of the line without raised platforms. The station is located between two grade crossings. When trains stop at the station, they block the roadway at one crossing or the other for entire duration of the stop, causing traffic backups.

The train station, constructed in 1875 by the New York and Long Branch Railroad, was added to the National Register of Historic Places in 1984.

From the Raritan Bayshore SeaStreak catamarans travel to Pier 11 at Wall Street and East 34th Street Ferry Landing in Manhattan. NY Waterway ferries travel to Paulus Hook Ferry Terminal in Jersey City, Battery Park City Ferry Terminal and West Midtown Ferry Terminal in Manhattan.

Notable people

People who were born in, residents of, or otherwise closely associated with Little Silver include:

 Chester Apy (born 1932), politician who represented District 5B in the New Jersey General Assembly from 1968 to 1970 and again from 1972 to 1974
 James Avati (1912–2005), artist and illustrator of paperback covers
 Virginia Bauer (born 1956), advocate for families of the victims of the September 11 terror attacks who is a Commissioner of the Port Authority of New York and New Jersey
 John O. Bennett (born 1948), former Assemblyman, State Senator, Senate Co-President and Acting Governor
 Dave Bry (1970–2017), writer, music journalist and editor at Vibe, Spin and XXL
 Brian Christian (born 1984), poet and nonfiction author
 Harold Hartshorne (1891–1961), Gold medal winner in figure skating
 Karl Guthe Jansky (1905–1950), the founder of radio astronomy
 Marilyn Levy (1922–2014), photographic chemist and inventor based at Fort Monmouth
 Susan Love (born 1948), surgeon, advocate of preventive breast cancer research and author
 Robert Lewis Morgan (born 1952), served in the New Jersey General Assembly for one term, from 2004 to 2006, where he represented the 12th Legislative District
 Russell Ohl (1898–1987), engineer who is generally recognized for patenting the modern solar cell
 Daniel J. O'Hern (1930–2009), former Associate Justice of the New Jersey Supreme Court
 Declan O'Scanlon (born 1963), represents the 13th Legislative District in the New Jersey General Assembly, and served on the Little Silver Borough Council from 1994–2007
 Theodore D. Parsons (1894–1978), New Jersey Attorney General from 1949–1954
 Mike Rice Jr. (born 1969), Rutgers Scarlet Knights men's basketball coach
 Meghan Tierney (born 1997), snowboarder who competed in snowboardcross for the United States at the 2018 Winter Olympics in Pyeongchang
 Greg Trooper (1956–2017), folk singer/songwriter
 Casey Webb, television host and professional eater, best known as the host of the television series Man v. Food

References

Sources
 Schnitzspahn, Karen L. Images of America: Little Silver, p. 106.

External links

 Borough of Little Silver official website
 Little Silver School District
 
 School Data for the Little Silver School District, National Center for Education Statistics
 Red Bank Regional High School
 
 School Data for the Red Bank Regional High School, National Center for Education Statistics
 Sickles Market History
 Eastern Monmouth Chamber of Commerce
 Property, tax, and hazard data for all parcels in Little Silver from PogoData
 A brief history of Little Silver from the Asbury Park Press, February, 2 2003
 "J.T. Lovett Company." Internet Archive
 Biodiversity Library: "J.T. Lovett Company."

 
1923 establishments in New Jersey
Borough form of New Jersey government
Boroughs in Monmouth County, New Jersey
Populated places established in 1923